Ashton-in-Makerfield is a town in the Metropolitan Borough of Wigan, Greater Manchester, England.  It contains ten listed buildings that are recorded in the National Heritage List for England.  All the listed buildings are designated at Grade II, the lowest of the three grades, which is applied to "buildings of national importance and special interest".  Industry, including coal mining, came to the town in the 19th century, but it is now mainly residential.  The older listed buildings consist of farmhouses, a farm building, a chapel and a milestone, and the later ones are churches and associated structures, and a library.
 

Buildings

References

Citations

Sources

Lists of listed buildings in Greater Manchester
Listed